Kamensk is the name of several inhabited localities in Russia.

Urban localities
Kamensk, Republic of Buryatia, an urban-type settlement in Kabansky District of the Republic of Buryatia

Rural localities
Kamensk, Bryansk Oblast, a village in Surazhsky District of Bryansk Oblast
Kamensk, Krasnoyarsk Krai, a village in Yeniseysky District of Krasnoyarsk Krai
Kamensk, Voronezh Oblast, a settlement in Pavlovsky District of Voronezh Oblast

See also
Kamensk-Shakhtinsky, a town in Rostov Oblast
Kamensk-Uralsky, a city in Sverdlovsk Oblast
Kamensky (inhabited locality) (Kamenskaya, Kamenskoye), name of several inhabited localities in Russia